Andrew Ireland (born 7 March 1953) is a former Australian rules footballer who played for the Collingwood Football Club in the Victorian Football League (VFL).

Ireland, who came to Collingwood from Ivanhoe, started his career as a forward and kicked 17 goals in his debut season before moving into defence. Usually playing on a half back flank, Ireland finished with 110 senior games and was a member of three losing Grand Final teams at Collingwood, 1977, 1979 and 1980. He represented Victoria in an interstate match against Tasmania in 1978.

Following his premature retirement at the age of 27 Ireland went into football administration and from 1990 to 2001 was the CEO of the Brisbane Bears/Lions. He also served as the Director of Football at the Sydney Swans.

References

 Profile at Collingwood Forever website

1953 births
Living people
Collingwood Football Club players
Ivanhoe Amateurs Football Club players
Brisbane Bears administrators
Brisbane Lions administrators
Sydney Swans administrators
Australian rules footballers from Victoria (Australia)